The 2021–22  MSV Duisburg season was the 122nd season in the club's football history. In 2021–22 the club played in the 3. Liga, the third tier of German football alongside the Lower Rhine Cup.

Team

Transfers

In

Out

New contracts

Friendlies

Competitions
Times from 1 July to 30 October 2020 and from 27 March to 30 June 2021 are UTC+2, from 31 October 2020 to 26 March 2021 UTC+1.

Overview

3. Liga

League table

Results summary

Results by round

Matches
The league fixtures were announced on 1 July 2021.

Lower Rhine Cup

Statistics

Squad statistics

† Player left during the season

Goals

Clean sheets

Disciplinary record

Notes

References

External links

German football clubs 2021–22 season
MSV Duisburg seasons